Vanessa Atterbeary (born June 24, 1975) is an American attorney and politician from the Democratic Party who represents District 13 in the Maryland House of Delegates.

Early life and career
Atterbeary was born on June 24, 1975 in Columbia, Maryland. She attended Clemens Crossing Elementary School, Clarksville Middle School, and graduated from Atholton High School. She attended the College of William and Mary, where she earned a bachelor's degree in government in 1997, and the Villanova University School of Law, where she earned a Juris Doctor three years later. While in law school, she started working at a shelter and participated in a clinic to help women gain protective orders. She is a member of the Alpha Kappa Alpha sorority.

After graduating from law school, Atterbeary clerked for Judge David W. Young of the Baltimore City Circuit Court. Atterbeary was admitted to Maryland State Bar Association in 2001 and the District of Columbia Bar in 2002. In 2002, Atterbeary joined the law firm Bulman, Dunie, Burke & Feld, where she worked as general counsel for five years. At the same time, she served on the Montgomery County Commission for Women, including as president.

Atterbeary first ran for the Maryland House of Delegates in 2010, for the District 18 delegate seat. She came in fifth place in a field of six candidates, receiving 13 percent of the vote in the primary election. In February 2014, Delegate Frank S. Turner approached her about filing to run in District 13, saying that he thought her Howard County roots would make her a more desirable candidate than she was in Montgomery County. She filed to run in the district on February 25, 2014 and ran on a "Team 13" slate with incumbent Delegates Guy Guzzone, Shane Pendergrass, and Turner. She won the Democratic primary with 27.3 percent of the vote.

Atterbeary is married and has three children. She lives in Maple Lawn, Fulton, Maryland.

In the legislature
Atterbeary was sworn into the Maryland House of Delegates on January 14, 2015. From 2018 to 2021, she served as the vice chair of the House Judiciary Committee. Since 2021, she has served as the chair of the House Ways and Means Committee.

Committee assignments
 Chair, Ways and Means Committee, 2021–present
 Member, Joint Committee on Children, Youth, and Families, 2017–present
 Rules and Executive Nominations Committee, 2019–present
 Chair, Work Group to Address Police Reform and Accountability in Maryland, 2020–present
 Member, Public Safety and Policing Work Group, 2015–2016
 Deputy Majority Whip, 2017–2018
 Member, Marijuana Legalization Work Group, 2019
 Vice-Chair, Judiciary Committee, 2019–2021 (member, 2015–2021; juvenile law subcommittee, 2015–2018; chair, family law subcommittee, 2017–2018, member, 2015–2020; chair, public safety subcommittee, 2019–2021; member, family & juvenile law subcommittee, 2021)

Other memberships
 House Chair, Howard County Delegation, 2016–2017, 2019–2020
 Member, Legislative Black Caucus of Maryland, 2015–present
 Member, Women Legislators of Maryland, 2015–present

Political positions

Education
Atterbeary introduced legislation in the 2016 legislative session that would put five of the seven members of the Howard County school board up for election. The bill was voted down, but was reintroduced in the 2019 legislative session where it passed unanimously.

Atterbeary introduced legislation in the 2019 legislative session that would remove school resource officers from school buildings.

Atterbeary introduced legislation in the 2019 legislative session that would allow the Howard County Council to raise fees against developers to cover the costs of school construction. Following amendments proposed by her colleagues, she voted against advancing the bill to the House floor. In 2020, she introduced a bill that would require the school board to submit a report addressing its deferred maintenance to the Howard County leaders in October. The bill failed to receive a vote.

In 2020, Atterbeary introduced legislation that would prevent the Howard County school board from enrolling students at schools with capacities greater than 115 percent.

Guns
Atterbeary introduced legislation in the 2020 legislative session that would require background checks for private sales of long guns. The bill passed and became law through a gubernatorial veto override on February 10, 2021.

Policing
In May 2020, Atterbeary was appointed to chair the Work Group to Address Police Reform and Accountability in Maryland, where she helped craft the Maryland Police Accountability Act of 2021. She opposed a proposed provision that would give jurisdictions the ability to allow independent police oversight boards to make disciplinary decisions. The bill passed and became law through a gubernatorial veto override on April 10, 2021.

In December 2021, Atterbeary said that agencies that did not comply with Anton's Law by issuing high fees or denying access to police records could have funding withheld.

Social issues
Atterbeary introduced legislation in the 2018 legislative session that would allow judges to admit evidence of past acts in trials of defendants accused of sexual assault.

Atterbeary introduced legislation in the 2019 legislative session that would raise the minimum age for marriage from 15 to 18 years. The bill failed, but was reintroduced in 2021, this time lowering the minimum age to 17 years. The bill was reintroduced and finally became law on April 21, 2022.

Electoral history

References

External links
 

Democratic Party members of the Maryland House of Delegates
African-American state legislators in Maryland
Women state legislators in Maryland
1975 births
Living people
African-American women in politics
21st-century American politicians
21st-century American women politicians
Atholton High School alumni
Maryland lawyers
21st-century American lawyers
21st-century American women lawyers
African-American women lawyers
African-American lawyers
College of William & Mary alumni
Villanova University School of Law alumni
People from Columbia, Maryland